Akbarabad (also Romanized as Akbarābād; also known as Akbarābād-e Gīv) is a village in Jolgeh-e Mazhan Rural District, Jolgeh-e Mazhan District, Khusf County, South Khorasan Province, Iran. At the 2006 census, its population was 612, in 153 families.

References 

Populated places in Khusf County